Monterde is a municipality located in the province of Zaragoza, Aragon, Spain. According to the 2010 census, the municipality had a population of 194 inhabitants. Its postal code is 50213.

See also
Comunidad de Calatayud
List of municipalities in Zaragoza

References

External links

Monterde site

Municipalities in the Province of Zaragoza